Soccer Bowl 2016 is the North American Soccer League's postseason championship match of the 2016 season which determined the NASL Champion.

Background 

The Indy Eleven were the first team to earn a spot in "The Championship", when they won the Spring Championship back in June. They edged out the New York Cosmos in the Spring season on the third tiebreaker (head-head). The New York Cosmos responded by winning the Fall Championship. They qualified with two games to spare and setting the home unbeaten record in modern NASL history. The league saw six teams fighting for the last playoff spot with four games left to play. Going into the final matchday, only two teams were left. Before their final regular season match, Rayo OKC qualified for "The Championship" in their first season.

Path to the final

Semi-final #1

Indy Eleven and FC Edmonton met three times in the regular season. They split the first game in the Spring season, and they each won their home match-ups in the Fall season.

Semi-final #2

The New York Cosmos come into the Semi-final match as the home team, having secured their spot by winning, both the Fall season and North American Supporters' Trophy on the same night, with two matches left to play. The Cosmos meet Rayo OKC in the 2nd Semi-Final. The two teams meet three times during the regular season. The third match was a 1—1 draw at the Cosmos' Shuart Stadium.

Stadium Controversy
Before the 2016 season began, Hofstra University told the Cosmos that there would be a scheduling conflict with the date of the 2016 Championship Final, and if the team were to host the championship game they would be forced to rent another venue.  The club considered sites around the area including MCU Park in Brooklyn, which was rejected because it would have cost thousands of dollars to bring in turf to cover the baseball lines.  The team also considered recommending a neutral site, or even selling the hosting rights to whatever club they would be facing in the Final, but those plans were never pursued.  The Cosmos tried to work out a deal with Hofstra, including moving the date of the Championship Final to a weekday, but those proposals were "shot down" by the university.

The Cosmos eventually settled on Belson Stadium on the campus of St. John's University.  The announcement that the league's championship game would be played in a 2200-seat venue prompted derision from fans of the club and league, who took to social media with the hashtag #BiggerThanBelson.  The Final was played at Belson but failed to sell out, with only 2,150 tickets sold.

Match

Summary

Details

2016 NASL Champions: New York Cosmos

Statistics

References 

2016

NASL Final 2016